The 1913–14 Kansas Jayhawks men's basketball team represented the University of Kansas during the 1913–14 college men's basketball season which was their 16th season. The Jayhawks, members of the MVIAA, were coached by W.O. Hamilton in his fifth year as coach and played their home games at Robinson Gymnasium. The Jayhawks finished the season 17–1 and were MVIAA Champions, their sixth conference championship. On February 19, 1914, the Jayhawks defeated Warrensburg (now known as Central Missouri) who were coached former Jayhawk basketball player and future long-time Kansas head coach Phog Allen in what was the first of two games Allen coached against his alma mater.

Roster
Lawrence Cole
Ray Dunmire
Ray Folks
Charles Greenless
Ralph Sproull
Edward Van der Vries
Arthur Weaver
William D. Weidlein

Schedule and results

References

Kansas
Kansas Jayhawks men's basketball seasons
Kansas Jayhawks Men's Basketball Team
Kansas Jayhawks Men's Basketball Team